Aru or ARU may refer to:

Education
 Alpha Rho Upsilon, a defunct fraternity in the United States
 Anglia Ruskin University, a university in England
 Ardhi University, a Tanzanian public university

Places
 Aru Islands Regency, a group of islands and the regency in the Moluccas
 Aru, Democratic Republic of Congo, a town in Ituri province
 Aru, Harju County, village in Kuusalu Parish, Harju County, Estonia
 Aru, Saare County, village in Saare Parish, Saare County, Estonia
 Aru, Kohgiluyeh and Boyer-Ahmad, village in Gachsaran County, Kohgiluyeh and Boyer-Ahmad Province, Iran
 Aru, Basht, village in Basht County, Kohgiluyeh and Boyer-Ahmad Province, Iran
 Aru, Damavand, village in Damavand County, Tehran Province, Iran
 Aru, Firuzkuh, village in Firuzkuh County, Tehran Province, Iran
 Aru, Jammu and Kashmir, village in India
 Aruba, IOC and UNDP country code ARU

Sports
 Fabio Aru, Italian cyclist
 Army Rugby Union, organizational body for rugby union in the British Army
 Australian Rugby Union, former name of Rugby Australia, governing body for rugby union in Australia

Technology
 Automated response unit, a telecommunications device
 Autonomous Recording Unit, an audio recording device

People
 Ines Aru (born 1939), Estonian actress
 Krista Aru (born 1958), Estonian historian, museologist and politician
 Peep Aru (born 1953), Estonian politician
 Aru Tateno (born 1997), Japanese ice dancer
 Aru Krishansh Verma (born 1986), Indian actor

Other uses
 American Railway Union, an industrial union in the United States
 Aquarium Rescue Unit, an American jazz-rock band
 Araçatuba Airport, IATA airport code
Arundel railway station, a railway station in England (National Rail code ARU)
 Aru language (disambiguation)
 Aru Kingdom, an early Islamic polity in northeast Sumatra between the 13th and 16th centuries

Estonian-language surnames